Reality Effect is the second album by the British band The Tourists, released in 1979.

This album received much more favourable reviews than the band's first album, with catchier songs and a stronger reliance on the vocals of singer Annie Lennox. The album contained two hit singles, "So Good to Be Back Home Again" (UK #8) and a cover of the 1964 Dusty Springfield song "I Only Want to Be With You" (UK #4).

Although the band featured Lennox and her future Eurythmics partner Dave Stewart on guitar, the bulk of the songs were written by singer/guitarist Peet Coombes. The album peaked at #23 on the UK Album Chart, and spent a total of sixteen weeks in the Top 100.

Reception
Smash Hits said, "Plenty of lasting writing talent but as much character as an iceberg. ELO would have been proud of some of this, but it's SO depressingly sombre. Let down by po-faced lyrics about 'life'."

Track listing
All tracks composed by Peet Coombes except where indicated

Side 1
"It Doesn't Have to Be This Way" – 3:45
"I Only Want to Be with You" – 2:24 (Mike Hawker, Ivor Raymonde)
"In the Morning (When the Madness has Faded)" – 4:09
"All Life's Tragedies" – 3:48
"Everywhere You Look" – 3:18
"So Good to Be Back Home Again" – 2:39
Side 2
"Nothing to Do" – 3:27
"Circular Fever" – 3:06 (Peet Coombes, Dave Stewart)
"In My Mind (There's Sorrow)" – 4:44
"Something in the Air Tonight" – 3:42
"Summer's Night" – 3:17

Personnel
The Tourists
Annie Lennox – vocals, organ, piano, harpsichord, string synthesizer
Peet Coombes – vocals, electric 6-string & 12-string guitars
David A. Stewart – electric guitars, acoustic guitars, backing vocals
Eddie Chin – bass guitar
Jim "Do It" Toomey – drums, percussion
with:
 - trumpet and string arrangements 
Technical
Andy Lunn, Bill Gill, Dick Plant, Barry Kidd - engineer
Tom Allom - producer

Charts

References

www.allmusic.com/album/reality-effect-r20325
The Guinness Book of British Hit Albums, fifth edition 1992

1979 albums
The Tourists albums
Albums produced by Tom Allom
Logo Records albums
Epic Records albums
Albums recorded at Olympic Sound Studios